David Paul Aschwege (born May 21, 1969) is an American former Major League Baseball (MLB) umpire and an executive for the Lincoln Saltdogs minor league baseball team. After umpiring in the minor leagues for several years, he served as a substitute umpire in MLB during 2003 and 2004. Aschwege joined the Lincoln front office after leaving minor league umpiring in 2007.

Career
Aschwege umpired in the minor leagues for thirteen seasons in the 1990s and 2000s, including eight years at the Triple-A level. After his minor league umpiring career ended, Aschwege became a ticket account executive with the Lincoln Saltdogs in 2007. He became the team's director of stadium operations the following season.

See also 

 List of Major League Baseball umpires

References

1969 births
Living people
Major League Baseball umpires
Sportspeople from Virginia
People from Vienna, Virginia
Sportspeople from Fairfax County, Virginia